Single Top 20, later as Single Top-20 and Track Top-40 is a record chart that ranks the best-performing songs of Denmark. Chart was owned by IFPI Danmark and Nielsen Music Control. Listings were provided through Billboard magazine under its "Hits of the World" section. Hitlisten, consisting of the Single Top-20 and Download Top 20 charts, launched on 1 January 2001 and served as the official chart for record sales in Denmark until the end of October 2007. Tracklisten was established 2 November 2007 with the Hitlisten charts being discontinued. Tracklisten is compiled by Nielsen Music Control in association with IFPI Danmark.

During the 2000s, 135 singles reached the number-one position on the chart. Band Depeche Mode was the most successful at reaching the top spot, with 5 number-one singles. Trine Dyrholm's EP "Mr. Nice Guy" spent 62 weeks at number one during 2005 and 2007, which was the longest spell at the top of the chart of the decade. The first number one of the decade, the "Love Will Keep Us Together" by Daniel. "Bad Romance" by Lady Gaga was the final number one of the decade.

Number one singles

By artist

See also
2000s in music

References

External links
 Hitlisten.nu (archive of Tracklisten goes back to week 1, 2007)
 danishcharts.dk (archive goes back to week 5, 2001 - before 2 November 2007 only Singles Top-20 appear)

Number-one songs
Denmark
2000s